Moti Gitik is a mathematician, working in set theory, who is professor at the Tel-Aviv University. He was an invited speaker at the 2002 International Congresses of Mathematicians, and became a fellow of the American Mathematical Society in 2012.

Research
Gitik proved the consistency of "all uncountable cardinals are singular" (a strong negation of the axiom of choice) from the consistency of "there is a proper class of strongly compact cardinals". He further proved the equiconsistency of the following statements: 
 There is a cardinal κ with Mitchell order κ++.
 There is a measurable cardinal κ with 2κ > κ+.
 There is a strong limit singular cardinal λ with 2λ > λ+.
 The GCH holds below ℵω, and 2ℵω=ℵω+2.
Gitik discovered several methods for building models of ZFC with complicated Cardinal Arithmetic structure. His main results deal with consistency and equi-consistency of non-trivial patterns  of the Power Function over singular cardinals.

Selected publications

See also

References

Living people
Academic staff of Tel Aviv University
Fellows of the American Mathematical Society
20th-century  Israeli mathematicians
21st-century  Israeli  mathematicians
Set theorists
Year of birth missing (living people)